Kjell Fredriksson (born 20 October 1944) is a Swedish boxer. He competed in the men's bantamweight event at the 1968 Summer Olympics.

References

External links
 

1944 births
Living people
Swedish male boxers
Olympic boxers of Sweden
Boxers at the 1968 Summer Olympics
People from Boden Municipality
Bantamweight boxers
Sportspeople from Norrbotten County
20th-century Swedish people